Dorval station is an intermodal bus and commuter rail station in Dorval, Quebec, Canada located on the Vaudreuil–Hudson line (exo1) of the Greater Montreal Exo public transport network. It is located within walking distance to inter-city rail services at Dorval Via Rail station.

Dorval is in ARTM fare zone A, and the station currently has 372 parking spaces. The adjacent STM bus terminal rivals the Fairview Bus Terminal as the busiest in the West Island but serves as the main interchange and the fastest link to Downtown Montreal for West Island travelers. The 211 bus route is the quickest link to a Metro station from the West Island. Nine Metro stations are served via the Dorval bus terminal, the most of any West Island train station. Roughly 15,000 people transit through the terminus daily, or 4.14 million a year.

 on weekdays, all 11 inbound trains and 12 outbound trains on the line call at this station. On weekends, all trains (four on Saturday and three on Sunday in each direction) call here. 

The station is located north of Autoroute 20 alongside the Dorval Circle interchange, about one kilometre south of Montreal-Pierre Elliott Trudeau International Airport. The station has two side platforms; access between them is provided by a tunnel connecting the large headhouses on either side of the tracks with the bus terminal building to the south.  

The current commuter station and bus terminal opened on August 29, 1988. 

Despite the proximity of the airport, there is no direct pedestrian or transit access other than the infrequent route 204 bus. Due to the construction of the Réseau express métropolitain (REM) rapid transit link to the airport, there have been calls for the connection to be extended one kilometre south to link with the train and bus stations here.

Bus services

Société de transport de Montréal

Nearby points of interest
 Montréal-Pierre Elliott Trudeau International Airport
 Jardins Dorval

References

External links

 Dorval Commuter Train Station Information (RTM)
 Dorval Commuter Train Station Schedule (RTM)
 2022 Exo Commuter Train Map (Réseau de trains)

Exo commuter rail stations
Railway stations in Montreal
Buildings and structures in Dorval
Transport in Dorval
Railway stations in Canada opened in 1887